Pol Pani is a Sri Lankan food filling made with coconut scrap. They are used to make various types of Sri Lankan sweets as Pancakes, Laveriya and Halapa.

See also
List of dishes made with coconut milk

References

Sri Lankan snack food
Foods containing coconut